Debra Elizabeth Jackson  is an Australian academic nurse and Professor of Nursing at the Susan Wakil School of Nursing at the University of Sydney, Australia. In 2021 she was awarded Professor Emerita in the Faculty of Health in the University of Technology Sydney. She holds a number of adjunct roles including Honorary Professor of Nursing, Oxford Health NHS Foundation Trust, visiting Professor at the Florence Nightingale Faculty of Nursing and Midwifery in King's College London, Bournemouth University, and Auckland University of Technology. She was previously the editor-in-chief of the Journal of Clinical Nursing and is now the editor-in-chief of the Journal of Advanced Nursing.

Education 
Jackson began her nursing career in New Zealand at the Auckland Hospital Board School of Nursing. She has a Bachelor of Health Science in nursing from Southern Cross University (1992), a Master of Nursing from the University of Sydney (1995), and a Doctor of Philosophy from Flinders University (2000). Jackson has completed advanced leadership training at the University of Oxford (2017).

Professional life 

Jackson has worked internationally and her previous positions include: Director, Oxford Institute for Nursing, Midwifery & Allied Health Research (2015–2018); Principal Fellow, NIHR Oxford Biomedical Research Centre (2016–2019); Professor of Nursing, Oxford Brookes University (2015–2018); Key Researcher, Research for Indigenous Health and Social Equity (ISHE), Murdoch University (2016–2018); and Professor of Nursing, Western Sydney University (2001–2011). Jackson's work is in social justice and health care, and patient safety, particularly in the area of preventable harm to patients, including pressure injuries, particularly in relation to pressure injury in community settings, and addressing cultural disparity in skin assessment, highlighting that non-Caucasian people experience a higher burden of harm from pressure injury due to difficulties in identifying early damage. As such, Jackson’s work has raised awareness of the issue of inequity in relation to prevention and early recognition of pressure injury in persons from non-Caucasian backgrounds.

Awards and honors 
Jackson is a Fellow of the Australian College of Nursing (2014), Senior Fellow of the Higher Education Academy (2018) and Fellow of the Royal College of Surgeons in Ireland ad eundem(2020). She is a member of Sigma Theta Tau Honour Society of Nursing (2000).  Jackson was named a Principal Fellowship of the NIHR Oxford Biomedical Research Centre (2015-2019). This was recorded in the New South Wales Parliament who recognised Jackson as a "highly regarded leader, academic, researcher, writer, mentor and member of the international nursing community". In 2019 Jackson was awarded the Order of Australia for distinguished service to medical education in the field of nursing practice and research as an academic and author. In 2020 Jackson was named as Australia’s leading nurse researcher by The Australian newspaper in their list of Australia’s Top 250 Researchers. Jackson was awarded Alumnus of the Year (Health), Southern Cross University (2017), and Distinguished Alumni Award from Flinders University (2016). In 2020 Jackson was admitted to the Royal Society Te Apārangi, New Zealand.. In 2021 Jackson was awarded Alumnus of the Year, Southern Cross University (2020).

Bibliography
Jackson has over 500 publications listed on Scopus that have been cited more than 7500 times, giving her an h-index of 42. Her three most-cited articles are:

References

External links

Scopus

Australian women nurses
Australian nurses
Australian people of New Zealand descent
Nursing researchers
Academic staff of the University of Technology Sydney
Academic journal editors
Academic staff of the University of New England (Australia)
University of Sydney alumni
Flinders University alumni
Officers of the Order of Australia
Living people
Academic staff of Western Sydney University
Academics of Oxford Brookes University
Australian expatriates in England
Year of birth missing (living people)
People from Takapuna